Balam Jerk (also Romanized as Balam Jerīk) is a village in Qaleh Qafeh Rural District, in the Central District of Minudasht County, Golestan Province, Iran. At the 2006 census, its population was 576, in 184 families.

References 

Populated places in Minudasht County